Akwa Ibom North-West Senatorial District in Akwa Ibom State covers 10 local government areas which comprise Abak, Essien, Etim Ekpo, Ika, Ikono, Ikot Ekpene, Ini, Obot, Oruk Anam and Ukanafun. This district has 108 Registration Areas (RAs) and 1124 polling units and location centre is located in the Ikot Ekpene INEC office. Chris Ekpenyong of the People’s Democratic Party, PDP is the current representative of Akwa Ibom North-West.

List of senators representing Akwa Ibom North-West

References 

Politics of Akwa Ibom State

Senatorial districts in Nigeria